Yukinori is a masculine Japanese given name.

Possible writings
Yukinori can be written using different combinations of kanji characters. Here are some examples: 

幸徳, "happiness, virtue"
幸憲, "happiness, constitution"
幸法, "happiness, method"
幸教, "happiness, teach"
幸典, "happiness, law code"
幸紀, "happiness, chronicle"
幸礼, "happiness, manners"
行規, "go, measure"
行徳, "go, virtue"
行法, "go, method"
以載, "by means of, to carry"
之紀, "of, chronicle"
之典, "of, law code"
之式, "of, ceremony"
志誠, "determination,  truth"
雪紀, "snow, chronicle"
恭徳, "respectful, virtue"
運昇, "luck, climb"

The name can also be written in hiragana ゆきのり or katakana ユキノリ.

Notable people with the name
, Japanese baseball player
, Japanese daimyō
, Japanese character illustrator and artist
, Japanese footballer
, Japanese baseball player
, aka PLATY, Japanese reggae singer
, aka Unshō Ishizuka, Japanese voicer actor
, Japanese engineer
, Japanese archaeologist
, Japanese manga artist
, Japanese executive director of broadcasting
, Japanese baseball player
, Japanese boat racer
, Japanese novelist
, Japanese mechanical engineer
, Japanese bicycle racer
, Japanese kugyō
, Japanese professional wrestling referee
, Japanese speed skater
, Japanese basketball player 
, Japanese baseball player
, Japanese footballer
, Japanese auto racer
, Japanese politician
, Japanese kickboxer
, Japanese boxer
, Japanese voice actor
, Japanese long-distance runner
, Japanese daimyō
, Japanese educator
, Japanese Brazilian Jiu-Jitsu black belt world medalist
, Japanese manga artist
, Japanese footballer
, Japanese political scientist
, Japanese warlord of the Warring States period
, Japanese basketball player and coach
, Japanese bowling player
, Japanese journalist
, Japanese baseball player
, Japanese writer
, Japanese swimmer
, Japanese politician
, Japanese chemist
, Japanese businessman and racing driver
, Japanese bicycle racer
, Japanese politician and businessman
, Japanese flutist and classical music conductor
, Japanese photographer
, Japanese microbiologist
, Japanese model
, Japanese artist
, Japanese historian

Fictional characters
Yukinori Matsumoto (松本 郁憲), from the manga and anime Kuroko no Basket
Yukinori Sawabe (沢辺 雪祈), from the manga and anime BLUE GIANT
Yukinori Shinohara (篠原 幸紀), from the manga and anime Tokyo Ghoul

Japanese masculine given names